The Sarnia Imperials were a football team from Sarnia, Ontario and a member of the Ontario Rugby Football Union, a league that preceded the Canadian Football League and contested for the Grey Cup until 1955. In their history, the Imperials appeared in three Grey Cup championship games, winning twice in 1934 and in 1936.

History

Pre-war
The Imperials first began playing in the ORFU in 1928, enjoying immediate success as they finished first in their division that year, only to lose the ORFU Final to the Toronto Balmy Beach Beachers. The team would go on to enjoy great success for the next 12 years, missing the post-season only once and winning the ORFU Final 10 of those 12 years. Sarnia played in their first Grey Cup championship game in 1933, which was also the only time the city hosted the Grey Cup game. However, the Imperials lost a low-scoring affair, falling 4–3 to the Toronto Argonauts in the lowest scoring Grey Cup game to date.

The team reversed their fortunes the next year, as they returned to the Dominion championship and came out victorious, defeating the Regina Roughriders 20–12 in the 22nd Grey Cup game. After losing to the Hamilton Tigers in the Eastern Final in 1935, the Imperials would return to the Grey Cup game in 1936. The team would secure their second Grey Cup win after their victory over the Ottawa Rough Riders in the 24th Grey Cup game. To date, they are the last amateur team to win the Grey Cup in peacetime.

While they would not return to the Grey Cup game, one of their more memorable victories came in 1937, when they crushed Montreal 63–0 in a Grey Cup quarter-final. This came at a time when touchdowns were worth only five points. The Imperials ceased play in the ORFU after the 1939 season due to World War II.

Post-war
After the Second World War, the Imperials were not as dominant as they had been before, but recovered by 1949, finishing with a winning record every year from that year until the end of their existence. In their last ten years of existence, they won two ORFU titles, in 1951 and 1952; they finished second several times in that span.

By this time, however, the ORFU was reckoned as a minor league. In the years after World War II, it became increasingly difficult for the ORFU to compete against the IRFU and the WIFU, both of which were now fully professional. After the 1953 season, the ORFU dropped out of contention for the Grey Cup, beginning the modern era of professional Canadian football.

Overall, the Imperials won their first ORFU title in 1929, then reeled off nine straight Ontario championships from 1931 to 1939. They also won the ORFU crown in 1951 and 1952, giving them a total of 12 championships, in addition to their two Grey Cups.

The team played its home matches at Sarnia's Athletic Park, now known as Norm Perry Park after the former star football player and Sarnia mayor.

The team ceased operations in 1955. ORFU football in Sarnia would return under the name of the Sarnia Golden Bears later in the decade. The Golden Bears won the 1958 and 1959 ORFU championships.

Canadian Football Hall of Famers
Imperials who were elected to the Canadian Football Hall of Fame-based solely on their play in Sarnia included Norm Perry, Orm Beach and Hugh 'Bummer' Stirling. Stirling was also named Canadian Male Athlete of the Year in 1938.

Ormond Beach
Tony Golab
Jack Newton
Norm Perry
Bummer Stirling

ORFU season-by-season

New incarnation
In 2006, the team was resurrected under the same name to play in the Northern Football Conference, Canada's top league for adult amateur play.

References

External links
Current incarnation home page
Just Sports Stats

Ontario Rugby Football Union teams
Sport in Sarnia
Canadian football teams in Ontario
Defunct Canadian football teams